The 1918–19 William & Mary Indians men's basketball team represented the College of William & Mary in intercollegiate basketball during the 1918–19 season. Under the first, and only, year of head coach Vernon Geddy (who, like his predecessor, concurrently served as head football coach), the team finished the season with a 3–6 record. This was the 14th season in program history for William & Mary, whose nickname is now the Tribe.

Schedule

|-
!colspan=9 style="background:#006400; color:#FFD700;"| Regular season

Source

References

William & Mary Tribe men's basketball seasons
William And Mary Indians
William and Mary Indians Men's Basketball Team
William and Mary Indians Men's Basketball Team